Luton railway station is located in the town centre of Luton, Bedfordshire, England. The station is about three minutes' walk from The Mall Shopping Centre. It is situated on the Midland Main Line and is operated by Thameslink.

History
Luton station was built by the Midland Railway in 1868 on its extension to St. Pancras. For some years, it was known as Luton Midland Road to distinguish it from the earlier Luton Bute Street, which was built in 1858 on the GNR line from Hertford North to Leighton Buzzard.

A public area, known as the Great Moor, had to be built through; the remainder of the land was bought for development by John Crawley, who provided a replacement in what is known as the People's Park. This proved a worthwhile investment because, as the town's staple trade in straw hats diminished as they went out of fashion, it was replaced by engineering works. By the beginning of the twentieth century, the population had nearly trebled and the station had become an important stop for main line expresses.

London, Midland and Scottish Railway
The station, consisting of only 3 platforms, was rebuilt in 1939 to the designs of the London, Midland and Scottish Railway company architect William Henry Hamlyn.

British Rail era
In 1960, a fourth platform was added. During electrification in the early 1980s, a fifth platform was added for the suburban services to and from St. Pancras.

Privatisation
Upon the opening of Eurostar at St. Pancras International, through-fares to continental Europe were made available from Luton and 67 other UK towns and cities to Paris, Brussels and other destinations in France and Belgium.

The station is set for significant investment from both Network Rail and First Group to improve facilities for customers, as well as creating longer platforms as part of the Thameslink Programme. In 2009, the station was identified as one of the ten worst category B interchange stations for mystery shopper assessment of fabric and environment; it is set to receive a share of £50 million funding for improvements. During 2010 and 2011, a number of improvements were implemented at the station; these included extensions to all five platforms (including removing the barrow crossing) and a new footbridge. The platform extensions formed part of the Thameslink Programme and allowed 12 car operation at the station. During these works, two new rail overbridges were installed over Old Bedford Road allowing the track to be slewed for the extended platforms.

Accidents and incidents 
There have been two accidents at Luton, one in 1955, the other in 1976:

1955 accident 

On 22 December 1955, two passenger trains collided at Luton station. One passenger was killed, and 23 injured. The first train, a local service from St Pancras to Leicester, had been given the "right away" from Luton and started to leave the station, but came to a halt when some late passengers attempted to board. As the train was clear of the Home signal, the signalman accepted the second train, an express from St Pancras to Derby. The signals were left at "Danger", so the Derby train should have stopped at the Home signal until the Leicester train had left the station. He was unable to stop the train in time, and it collided with the stationary Leicester train. The rear two coaches of the Leicester train telescoped into each other, causing the majority of casualties. The official enquiry held the driver of the Derby train responsible for the collision, but also noted that the lights from the nearby Vauxhall factory obscured the view of the Distant signal. The lighting was reorganised following the accident.

1976 accident 

A passenger train being operated by a diesel multiple unit overran signals and collided with another diesel multiple unit at Luton South Signal Box. An express passenger train then collided with the wreckage, striking it with a glancing blow.

Facilities 

The station participates in the Plusbus scheme where train and bus tickets can be bought together for a cheaper price. It is in the same area as Luton Parkway and Leagrave stations.
FastTicket machines are used at this station.

Luton station has the following facilities:
2 waiting rooms,
newsagent,
cafe,
telephones,
ATM,
ticket barriers,
toilets, and
a car park with 669 spaces.

Services 
Services at Luton are operated by East Midlands Railway and Thameslink using  and  EMUs.

The typical off-peak service in trains per hour is:

East Midlands Railway
 2 tph to London St Pancras International
 2 tph to 

Thameslink
 2 tph to  via 
 2 tph to Three Bridges via 
 2 tph to  via 

Connections
Luton Station Interchange, in front of the station building, provides connections with local and regional bus services.

The Luton to Dunstable Busway serves Luton Station Interchange. This guided bus route, opened in 2013, provides bus rapid transit services 24 hours a day between Dunstable, Houghton Regis, Luton town and  Luton Airport.
1 bus per hour to Milton Keynes Central operated by  Stagecoach in Bedford (99) (formerly Virgin Trains). This starts at Luton Airport and only calls at a limited number of express bus stops en route.
1 bus per hour to Luton Airport forming the return portion of the above

There was previously a shuttle bus service from the station to nearby London Luton Airport; however, the dedicated shuttle ceased following the construction of Luton Airport Parkway station. There are still regular buses via the Busway to Luton Airport, via Arriva's A bus, and the Stagecoach hourly 99 bus service also runs directly to the Airport terminal.

References

External links 

Buildings and structures in Luton
Railway stations in Bedfordshire
Former Midland Railway stations
DfT Category B stations
Railway stations in Great Britain opened in 1868
Railway stations served by East Midlands Railway
Railway stations served by Govia Thameslink Railway
Transport in Luton/Dunstable Urban Area
Railway accidents involving a signal passed at danger
William Henry Hamlyn buildings
Rail accidents caused by a driver's error